Horace Hall Edwards (August 21, 1902 – January 27, 1987) was an American politician, who was mayor of Richmond, Virginia, and a candidate for governor in 1949.

Edwards was born in Isle of Wight County, Virginia. After graduating from the University of Richmond, he set up a law practice in Richmond. From 1946 to 1948 Edwards served as mayor of Richmond, the last one who served as chief executive officer of Richmond under the city's bicameral system of government before a charter change transitioned the city to a council-manager form of government.

Edwards chaired the Democratic Party's State Central Committee from 1940 to 1948. He entered a four-candidate race for the 1949 Democratic nomination for governor. Edwards proposed a 2 percent sales tax to finance improvements to public education. In the Democratic primary Edwards finished third with only 15 percent of the vote.

Edwards is buried in Hollywood Cemetery.

References
 Who's Who in America (1966–1967), 607.
 Richmond News Leader, 27, 28 Jan. 1987.
 Richmond Times-Dispatch, 22 May 1949, 29 Dec. 1963, 28, 31 Jan. 1987.
 Horace H. Edwards Papers (1941–1977), Virginia Commonwealth University, Richmond, Va.

1902 births
1987 deaths
Mayors of Richmond, Virginia
University of Richmond alumni
20th-century American politicians